John Peyton may refer to:
John Peyton (by 1500-58), MP for Winchelsea
Sir John Peyton (soldier) (1544–1630), English soldier, MP and Governor of Jersey
Sir John Peyton, 1st Baronet (1561–1616), MP for Cambridgeshire
John Peyton (died 1635), MP for Castle Rising
John Peyton (fisherman) (1749–1829), fisherman and fur trader in Newfoundland
John Peyton Jr., justice of the peace, the son of the above
Sir John Strutt Peyton (1786–1838), captain in the Royal Navy
John Peyton, Baron Peyton of Yeovil (1919–2006), British politician who served as Minister for Transport
John Peyton (American politician) (born 1964), American politician and mayor of Jacksonville, Florida 2003–2011

See also
John Payton (1946–2012), American civil rights attorney
Jon Peyton Price, British actor